Nong Boua is a village in Bolikhamsai Province, in western Laos. It lies in Paksan District, to the east by road from Paksan on the road to Na Hom and Na Khaulom.

References

Populated places in Bolikhamsai Province